Christianno Andrey de Araújo Vieira (born 29 September 1991), simply known as Christianno, is a Brazilian footballer who plays as a left back for Botafogo-PB.

In 29 June 2016, Christianno signed a three-year-deal with C.S. Marítimo.

References

External links

1991 births
Living people
Brazilian expatriate footballers
Footballers from Rio de Janeiro (city)
Brazilian footballers
Association football defenders
Campeonato Brasileiro Série A players
Campeonato Brasileiro Série B players
Campeonato Brasileiro Série D players
Mogi Mirim Esporte Clube players
Paulista Futebol Clube players
Bangu Atlético Clube players
Vila Nova Futebol Clube players
C.S. Marítimo players
CR Vasco da Gama players
Sport Club do Recife players
Luverdense Esporte Clube players
Boa Esporte Clube players
Boavista Sport Club players
Botafogo Futebol Clube (PB) players
Brazilian expatriate sportspeople in Portugal
Expatriate footballers in Portugal